Shadow Dancing is the second studio album by English singer-songwriter Andy Gibb, released in June 1978 in the United States and September 1978 in the United Kingdom. It was Gibb's highest charting album in some countries including America and in Canada. This LP was his only album to chart in the UK. Four singles, including the three US Top 10 singles, were released from the album.

Continuing the momentum of his first successes, notably "I Just Want to Be Your Everything", he began work with the Gibb-Galuten-Richardson production team on his second album. Although the album is not currently in print, it was released to iTunes along with the other two Andy Gibb albums in 2011.

Recording
Gibb's second album was made under the direction of Albhy Galuten and Karl Richardson, mostly while Barry, Robin and Maurice were off filming Sgt. Pepper's Lonely Hearts Club Band up to January. Shadow Dancing was recorded from December 1977 to February 1978. Barry again was executive producer and was present during recording of a few of the songs. John Sambataro, who sang backing and harmony vocals on the non-Barry songs, plays slide guitar. Sambataro later worked with Dave Mason and McGuinn, Clark & Hillman and he later joined Firefall. "Why" has feature a slide guitar by John Sambataro, as well as the guitar work of Jock Bartley of Firefall, "I Go for You" features guitar work by Don Felder of Eagles.

Gibb also relied on Galuten's musical expertise to help translate his musical ideas into reality by co-writer or co-composer of some of his songs, as Gibb says "He'll sit down at the keyboards and find chords that we're hearing. He's magic. He hears exactly what you're hearing. 'One More Look at the Night' – that came across in 10 or 15 minutes".

In February 1978, Gibb participated on Stephen Stills' songs "You Can't Dance Alone" and "What's the Game" singing backing vocals along with Dave Mason, from the album Thoroughfare Gap and Gibb's band including Joey Murcia, George Perry, John Sambataro and Joe Lala also plays on both songs. (Back in 1976, Stills visited the Bee Gees recording Children of the World and played percussion on "You Should Be Dancing".)

Critical reception

Shadow Dancing contains four singles including the title track, written by Gibb and all three of his brothers, was released as a single in the US in April 1978 and in mid-June began a seven-week run at No. 1, achieving platinum status. Two further top ten singles, "An Everlasting Love" (#5) and "(Our Love) Don't Throw It All Away" (#9), a song also released by his brothers in 1979, were extracted from the album, which became a million seller.
Amy Hanson at Allmusic retrospectively described "Fool for a Night" as a 'bittersweet, up tempo piece of pop', "Melody" as a 'wistful love song', and "I Go for You" as 'smarmy as it may be in hindsight, was still better than many of its contemporaries'.

Gibb, talking about his recently finished album, "I am so much more confident now after doing this second album, dealing with the pressures of proving to myself that the first one wasn't a fluke and that I could write a second album. So now I am a lot more confident". Following the release of Shadow Dancing, RSO arranged a mini-tour of Europe to promote the new album, with planned concerts in the UK as well as other European countries. The album was reissued by Spectrum Records in 1992 and Polydor Records in 1998. Rights to the album are now owned by Andy's daughter Peta Gibb Weber, and Capitol has made the album available through online music stores and streaming sites.

Track listing
All tracks written by Andy Gibb, except where noted.

Personnel 
 Andy Gibb – lead and backing vocals
 Albhy Galuten – synthesizers, string arrangements (1, 4, 5, 6, 9), string conductor (1, 4, 5, 6, 9)
 George Bitzer – keyboards (1-4, 6-10)
 Paul Harris – keyboards (5)
 Joey Murcia – electric guitar (1, 3-7, 9, 10)
 Tim Renwick – acoustic guitar (1, 3-7, 9, 10), electric guitar (1, 3-7, 9, 10)
 Jock Bartley – guitars (2)
 John Sambataro – backing vocals, slide guitar (2)
 Don Felder – guitars (8)
 Harold Cowart – bass
 Ron Ziegler – drums 
 Joe Lala – percussion
 Neal Bonsanti – saxophones, woodwinds
 Whit Sidener – saxophones, woodwinds
 Stan Webb – saxophones, woodwinds
 Peter Graves – trombone
 Ken Faulk – trumpet 
 Bill Purse – trumpet 
 Barry Gibb – string arrangements (1, 4, 5, 6, 9), backing vocals (1, 2, 4, 5)
 Blue Weaver – string arrangements (5)
 Sid Sharp – concertmaster (Los Angeles string section)
 Bob Basso – concertmaster (Miami string section)

Production 
 Barry Gibb – producer (1, 2, 4, 5), executive producer (3, 6-10)
 Albhy Galuten – producer 
 Karl Richardson – producer, engineer
 John Blanche – assistant engineer
 Dennis Hetzendorfer – assistant engineer
 David Gertz – assistant engineer
 Glen Ross – art direction 
 Tim Bryant – design
 Gary Heery – photography

Charts

Weekly charts

Year-end charts

References

1978 albums
Andy Gibb albums
Albums produced by Barry Gibb
Albums arranged by Barry Gibb
RSO Records albums
Disco albums by English artists